Kent Doyle Logsdon is an American diplomat who has served as the U.S. ambassador to Moldova since February 2022. He previously served as the U.S. chargé d'affaires for Germany.

Early life
A Sewickley, Pennsylvania native, Logsdon has a master's degree in international relations from the University of Virginia and a bachelor's degree in government from the University of Notre Dame.

Career

A foreign service officer (a member of the Senior Foreign Service), Logsdon was chief of staff to under secretary for economic growth, energy and the environment Keith J. Krach from September 30, 2019, to July 30, 2021. Previously, he served as the principal deputy assistant secretary in the Bureau of Energy Resources. He came to that position after serving as the deputy chief of mission at the U.S. Embassy in Berlin, Germany, serving as chargé d'affaires from January 2017 to May 2018. Logsdon was the chief of staff to the deputy secretary of state for management and resources in Washington, D.C. before he went to Berlin.

According to the State Department, Logdson "has spent the bulk of his career, spanning over 34 years, in the European and Eurasia region."

United States ambassador to Moldova
On July 13, 2021, President Joe Biden nominated Logsdon to be the United States Ambassador to Moldova. On September 29, 2021, a hearing on his nomination was held before the Senate Foreign Relations Committee. On October 19, 2021, his nomination was reported favorably out of committee. On December 18, 2021, the United States Senate confirmed his nomination by voice vote. On February 16, 2022, he presented his credentials to President Maia Sandu.

Personal life
Logsdon speaks Russian, Ukrainian, Thai and German. He is also learning Romanian.

See also
 List of ambassadors of the United States to Germany
 List of ambassadors of the United States to Moldova

References

External links

Year of birth missing (living people)
Living people
21st-century American diplomats
Ambassadors of the United States to Germany
Ambassadors of the United States to Moldova
People from Sewickley, Pennsylvania
United States Foreign Service personnel
University of Notre Dame alumni
University of Virginia alumni